Monica Van Nassauw (born 7 December 1968) is a former Belgian racing cyclist. She finished in second place in the Belgian National Road Race Championships in 1993.

References

External links

1968 births
Living people
Belgian female cyclists
Cyclists from Antwerp Province
People from Essen, Belgium